Kote Marjanishvili State Academic Drama Theatre is a state theatre in Tbilisi, Georgia. It is one of the oldest and most significant theatres in the country, coming second perhaps only to the national Rustaveli Theatre.

The theatre was founded in Kutaisi in 1928 by Kote Marjanishvili. It moved to Tbilisi in 1930 to the former Brothers Zubalashvili philanthropic "Public House", the building it still occupies. The theatre's art nouveau edifice was thoroughly renovated and reopened in 2006 with the premiere of Bertolt Brecht's The Threepenny Opera.

References 

Cultural venues in Tbilisi
Theatres in Georgia (country)